Jean-Guy Wallemme (born 10 August 1967) is a French professional football manager and former player who is the head coach of  club Paris 13 Atletico.

Playing career
Wallemme was a mainstay of the Lens team which won the French championship in 1998.

Managerial career 
In August 2011, Wallemme took over the Congo national team. On 23 March 2012, it was announced that he would combine his Congolese job with management of Auxerre. He left his job with Congo in October 2012.

In May 2018, Wallemme was announced as the manager of the newly merged club C'Chartres for the 2018–19 season. On 12 November 2019, it was confirmed, that Wallemme had become the new manager of the Niger national team, but still would continue as manager of C'Chartres as well. Wallemme was in charge for two games at the 2021 Africa Cup of Nations qualification and lost both against Ivory Coast and Madagascar. Ten days later, it was reported, that Wallemme had returned to France and that it was not sure that he would manage Niger later again, as he had not signed any deal with them.

In May 2020, Wallemme was released from his duties by C'Chartres, and within a few days had signed up to manage Fréjus Saint-Raphaël. In June 2022, he signed for Paris 13 Atletico.

References

External links

 French Profile, stats and pictures

1967 births
Living people
French footballers
Association football defenders
RC Lens players
Coventry City F.C. players
FC Sochaux-Montbéliard players
AS Saint-Étienne players
Ligue 1 players
Ligue 2 players
Premier League players
French expatriate footballers
Expatriate footballers in England
French expatriate sportspeople in England
French football managers

Racing Club de France Football managers
FC Rouen managers
Paris FC managers
RC Lens managers
Congo national football team managers
AJ Auxerre managers
R.W.D.M. Brussels F.C. managers
USM Bel Abbès managers
JS Kabylie managers
ASO Chlef managers
KAC Kénitra managers
Niger national football team managers
ÉFC Fréjus Saint-Raphaël managers
Paris 13 Atletico managers
Ligue 1 managers
Algerian Ligue Professionnelle 1 managers
Botola managers
Championnat National managers
French expatriate football managers
Expatriate football managers in Belgium
French expatriate sportspeople in Belgium
Expatriate football managers in the Republic of the Congo
French expatriate sportspeople in the Republic of the Congo
Expatriate football managers in Algeria
French expatriate sportspeople in Algeria
Expatriate football managers in Morocco
French expatriate sportspeople in Morocco
Expatriate football managers in Niger
French expatriate sportspeople in Niger